Native Public Media is a public broadcasting organization that provides media services to Native Americans. Services provided include programming and funding for native-owned radio stations, as well as broadband and cable television services. Founded in 2004, the organisation is based in Flagstaff, Arizona. Native Public Media receives funding from the National Federation of Community Broadcasters and the Corporation for Public Broadcasting, as well as donations from listeners.

References
 Reuters, March 11, 2009
 Indian Country Today, February 3, 2009
 Current, January 29, 2001

External links
 Native Public Media

2004 establishments in Arizona
Citizen mass media in the United States
Mass media companies established in 2004
Native American history of Arizona
Native American radio
Non-profit organizations based in Arizona
Publicly funded broadcasters